The 1994–95 Club América season was the 53rd season competing in Primera Division.

Summary 
In summertime Emilio Diez-Barroso in his 15th season as club President and in his 5th year without a league title, reinforced the squad with several players such as: Forward Francois Omam Biyik, Right-back Defender Raul Gutierrez, midfielders Joaquin del Olmo and Kalusha Bwalya. Also, arrived Dutch manager Leo Beenhakker after coached the squad of Saudi Arabia.  The new coach and transfers in combined with young talented players lead by Forward Cuauhtemoc Blanco improved the performance played by the squad reaching the first position on table and deploying a spectacular game attracting the best attendances to Azteca stadium in years. 

Meanwhile, the squad could maintain the good streak during the first month of the year, in spite of four club players: Zague, Luis Garcia, Raul Gutierrez and Joaquin del Olmo were playing the 1995 King Fahd Cup from 1 January to 6 January. 

Owing to their participation in 1995 Pan American Games by young players  Raul Lara, German Villa and Cuauhtemoc Blanco representing the national U-23 team, the offensive line was sinking from 10 March to 24 March, hence, the squad only clinched two draws against Toros Neza and archrivals CD Guadalajara despite being heavily favourites. 

In spite of having the best season performance and attendances since the 80s manager Leo Beenhakker was under pressure since January by both club vice president Rubolotta and President Diez Barrosso to line up Forward Luis Garcia recently transferred in from Real Sociedad with an infamous 1 year tenure without scoring a single league goal (since 1 May 1994 with Atletico Madrid). Meanwhile, the club and talented midfielder Joaquin del Olmo had contract issues due to a renewal for the next seasons the conflict escalated upon reached manager Beenhakker asked by the President Barroso to not line up Del Olmo against Puebla FC on April 5. However, the Dutch coach lined-up Del Olmo and was sacked by vice president Rubolotta the next day by 0730 hs at his home in Cuernavaca according to Beenhakker. Finally, with Mirko Jozic as new manager the squad was eliminated in semifinals for the third consecutive year losing the series against Cruz Azul.

Squad

Transfers

Winter

Competitions

La Liga

League table

Group 1

General table

Results by round

Matches

Quarterfinals

Semifinals

Copa Mexico

First round

Second round

Semifinals

Statistics

Players statistics

References

External links

Club América seasons
1994–95 Mexican Primera División season
1994–95 in Mexican football